Spilodiscus is a genus of clown beetles in the family Histeridae. There are about 9 described species in Spilodiscus.

Species
 Spilodiscus arcuatus (Say, 1825)
 Spilodiscus biplagiatus (J. E. LeConte, 1845)
 Spilodiscus flohri (Lewis, 1898)
 Spilodiscus floridanus Ross, 1940
 Spilodiscus gloveri (Horn, 1870)
 Spilodiscus instratus (J. L. LeConte, 1859)
 Spilodiscus sellatus (J. L. LeConte, 1857)
 Spilodiscus skelleyi Caterino and Kovarik, 2001
 Spilodiscus ulkei (Horn, 1870)

References

 Caterino, Michael S. (1998). "A phylogenetic revision of Spilodiscus Lewis (Coleoptera: Histeridae)". Journal of Natural History, vol. 32, no. 8, 1129–1168.
 Mazur, Slawomir (1997). "A world catalogue of the Histeridae (Coleoptera: Histeroidea)". Genus, International Journal of Invertebrate Taxonomy (Supplement), 373.

Further reading

 NCBI Taxonomy Browser, Spilodiscus
 Arnett, R. H. Jr., M. C. Thomas, P. E. Skelley and J. H. Frank. (eds.). (21 June 2002). American Beetles, Volume II: Polyphaga: Scarabaeoidea through Curculionoidea. CRC Press LLC, Boca Raton, Florida .
 
 Richard E. White. (1983). Peterson Field Guides: Beetles. Houghton Mifflin Company.

Histeridae